Latrobe is an unincorporated community and coal town in Logan County, West Virginia, United States.

References

Unincorporated communities in Logan County, West Virginia
Unincorporated communities in West Virginia
Coal towns in West Virginia